The Hand of Saint James the Apostle is a holy relic brought to England by Empress Matilda in the 12th century. In 1539 at the Dissolution of the Monasteries, English monks hid the hand in an iron chest in the walls of Reading Abbey. It was dug up again in 1786 by workmen and given to Reading Museum. In 1840 it was sold to J. Scott Murray, who put it in his private chapel at Danesfield House. On his death in 1882 he gave it to St. Peter's Church in Great Marlow (now Marlow), which is where it resides today.

Timeline

A timeline of the history of the hand is as follows:

640 — Records first document the hand being stored by Bishop of Torcello, Venice
1133 — Given to Reading Abbey by Emperor Henry V's widow Matilda, daughter of Henry I
1136 — Henry of Blois (later Bishop of Winchester) [corr] borrows relic for prayer
1155 — Returned to Reading Abbey
1220 — Used in healing miracles and dipped into 'water of St James'
1539 — Monks stashed it in an old iron chest and hid it in the Abbey walls during the Dissolution of the Monasteries
1786 — Unearthed by workmen building Reading Gaol and given to Reading Museum (private)
1840s — Sold to J Scott Murray placed in his private chapel at Danesfield House, Reading and Marlow.
1882 — On his death left to St Peter's Church, Marlow, where it is stored today.

References 

Body parts of individual people
Christian relics
Empress Matilda